Teodoro Kalaw III (born 4 August 1947) is a Filipino former sports shooter. He competed in the 50 metre pistol event at the 1972 Summer Olympics.

Teodoro Kalaw married Maria Trinidad Yujuico, the first female chair of the Philippine Stock Exchange. His son, Teodoro Alejandro Y. Kalaw IV,
a lawyer, lectures at the Ateneo de Manila Law School.

References

External links
 

1947 births
Living people
Filipino male sport shooters
Olympic shooters of the Philippines
Shooters at the 1972 Summer Olympics
Place of birth missing (living people)